Col du Granon (el. ) is a high mountain pass in the Alps in the department of Hautes-Alpes in France. A narrow tarmac road winds steeply up the southern approach. Gravel roads continue beyond the pass, in a military training zone. 

Eduardo Chozas of Spain won the stage after a long lone breakaway. 

During the 2022 Tour de France Team Jumbo-Visma launched a relentless attack against two-time defending champion Tadej Pogačar, using Wout van Aert, Christophe Laporte and Primož Roglič, which allowed Jonas Vingegaard to seize the yellow jersey. Like LeMond in 1986, Vingegaard would defend his lead for the rest of the race.

Description
From the east a dirt road to the military pass at Val-des-Prés climbs  at almost 7% gradient.

Tour de France – stage finishes

See also
 List of highest paved roads in Europe
 List of mountain passes
 Ouvrage Col du Granon, part of the Alpine Line fortifications of southeastern France

References

External links
Cycling Col du Granon - Elevation Profile, Map, Photos
Le col du Granon dans le Tour de France 

Mountain passes of Provence-Alpes-Côte d'Azur
Mountain passes of the Alps
Landforms of Hautes-Alpes
Transport in Provence-Alpes-Côte d'Azur